Bhai Lalo was born in 1452 at the village of Saidpur presently known as Eminabad in Pakistan. His father's name was Bhai Jagat Ram Ghataura (ਤਰਖਾਣ)of the Ghataura surname pertaining to the carpenter clan.

Bhai Lalo was known for his name in Sikh historic incident with first guru of sikhs Guru Nanak. One day Malik Bhago, a high government official of the city, gave a general feast. He invited Guru Nanak Dev Ji too. Guru ji declined the invitation of Bhago. On being asked a second time, Guru Nanak Dev Ji took Bhai Lalo with him and went to Malik Bhago's house. He is honest man and Guru Nanak Dev Ji praised him

Guru Nanak Dev Ji took Bhai Lalo's dry chapati in his right hand and Malik Bhago's fried sweet pancake in his left hand. When he squeezed the right hand the people present there saw drops of milk dripping from it. And when he pressed the left hand with the Malik Bhago's fried pancakes, everyone saw blood trickling from it.

Malik Bhago was silent on seeing all this. Bhai Lalo on the other hand was the symbol of honesty and hardwork. So according to Guru Nanak Dev Ji, it's better to earn little money with honesty than to amass a huge wealth by devious and crooked means.

See also
Bhai Bala
Bhai Mardana

References

External links
Bhai Lalo

Indian Sikhs
1452 births